Shakespeare Writing "Julius Caesar", also known as La Rêve de Shakespeare, was a 1907 French short silent film directed by Georges Méliès.

Production
Méliès himself plays Shakespeare in the film. The film was his last cinematic work derived from the plays of William Shakespeare; earlier in the same year, Méliès had filmed a film adaptation of Shakespeare's Hamlet.

Release and reception
Shakespeare Writing "Julius Caesar" was released by Méliès's Star Film Company, and is numbered 995–999 in its catalogues. It was registered for American copyright at the Library of Congress on 25 October 1907. The film is currently presumed lost.

Film scholar Robert Hamilton Ball, in his study of Shakespearean silent films, calls the film "a pleasant little scenario", but comments that the film's concluding tableau, strongly reminiscent of Méliès's work as a magician, "unfortunately shows … the need for a transformation, however inappropriate." Film scholar Judith Buchanan emphasises the cosmopolitan political effect of this final scene, which she describes as a "sentimental tribute to a universalising poet". Buchanan argues that this all-embracing view of Shakespeare puts Méliès's film in sharp contrast with the next known adaptation of the play, Vitagraph Studios's Julius Caesar the following year; Vitagraph's version heavily underlined its Americanness and prioritised "individual patriotism" above global concerns.

In an article on Shakespearean cinema, Anthony Guneratne mentions the film, highlighting that by "showing the poet struggling to dramatize difficult material," Méliès created "a special-effects-dominated precursor of Shakespeare in Love". The historian Deborah Cartmell comments: "It's not hard to speculate that Méliès's decision to play the part of the playwright is an implicit assertion that the filmmaker is 'the new Shakespeare,' but, as the film is no longer available, it is impossible to know how far this can be taken."

References

External links

Films directed by Georges Méliès
1907 films
Lost French films
Films based on Julius Caesar (play)
French silent short films
French black-and-white films
Films about William Shakespeare
Silent war films
1900s French films